Shukranīti (–) also known as Shukranītisara (–) is a part of Dharmasastra and considered as Shukracharya's System of Morals. It is a treatise on the science of governance, structured towards upholding the morals through implementing theories of political science. The code is authored by Shukracharya also known as Usanas and claimed to be originated during Vedic period. However, modern historians claim, the composition dating as early as the 4th century AD Gupta period and some have even claimed it to be a forgery from as recent as a 19th-century. The term Niti is derived from the Sanskrit word which, in English translates to To Lead implying proper guidance. ShukraNiti focuses on morality, which it stresses is necessary for the overall well being of the people and the state (Rajya). Thus, attempts to regulate the economic, social, and political aspects of human activity. According to the Shukranīti, the main responsibilities of the king should be towards the protection of his subjects and punishment of the offenders, and such actions cannot be enacted without a guideline (Niti). According to Shukracharya: a person can live without grammar, logic, and Vedanta but cannot do in absence of Niti, and describes it as an essential aspect required for maintaining social order in the society.

History

Claims of much later period of origin
Lallanji Gopal cites many authorities and disputes the origin of ShukraNiti to the Vedic period and claims the work to be originated at a much later date. The claims of this theory is based on the mention of guns, gunpowder, and cannons in the work. Modern historians argue, though some incendiary arrows were used in ancient India, and there is no mention of fire-arms using gunpowder in those texts. Since guns were introduced to India by the Portuguese in the early 16th century and later used in the first Battle of Panipat. Hence, according to them, the origin of the Shukranīti is attributed to the 16th century AD. Similarly, J C. Ray places the origin to 11th century AD based on the use of the word Yavana and Mleccha in the ShukraNiti. According to him, the term Yavana or Mleccha's is referred to Greeks and Muslims respectively during the 11th century, by this time Mlecchas had spread in most parts of India, he concludes relating them to Yemini Turks, that is to Mahmud of Ghazni. Some historians, based on the reference made to various classifications of punishment meted out to the offenders and on other regulations mentioned in the Shukranīti, conclude that the work was modern in approach, hence a nineteenth-century composition.

Claims of origin from Vedic period
Dr. Gustav Oppert, who was the first to compile and edit the original work of Shukracharya's Shukranīti in Sanskrit and placed the origin of the work to the Vedic period. According to some scholarly interpretations, the Shukranīti is frequently mentioned in Hindu epics like Ramayana and Mahabharata and was originally written by Brahma in a voluminous 100,000 chapters, which later was reduced to a readable one thousand chapters by Shukracharya. Dr. Oppert in his other work on ancient India further elaborates on the much contentious issue on the mention of the use of firearms in Shukranīti. He provides archaeological evidences from the ancient temple carvings in India, where soldiers are depicted carrying or in some cases firing the firearms. Thus, proving his claim on the use of firearms in Shukranīti as authentic and establishing the use of firearms, gunpowder was known in India since the ancient Vedic period. This theory is further supported by some modern historians, in which the use of gunpowder, firearms, and cannons are described as weapons used in warfare in some Vedic literature. On the issue of antiquity, R. G Pradhan observes, as the more recent work Kamandaka Nitisara praises and quotes extensively from the Shukranīti and he further asserts, the age of the ShukraNiti should be much earlier than the former. Similarly, other historians, on the basis that Kautilyas Arthashastra opens with salutations to Shukracharya and Brhaspati, in accordance with that, Shama Shastri concludes that the ShukraNiti has to be older than the Arthashastra and placed the origin of Shukracharya's work to be of 4th-century BC.

Overview
The Shukranīti as a comprehensive codebook lays out guidelines in both political and non-political aspects required in maintaining social order in the state. The political part of the book deals with guidelines relating to a king, the council of ministers, the justice system, and international laws. Whereas, the non-political part deals with morals, economics, architecture, other social, and religious laws. These laws are elaborately enshrined into five chapters in this epic.
The first chapter deals with the duties and functions of the king.
The second elaborates on the duties of the crown prince and other administrators of the state.
The third chapter puts forth the general rules of morality.
The fourth is the largest chapter in the work, which is divided into seven parts.
The first subsection describes the maintenance of the treasure.
The second on social customs and institutions in the kingdom.
The third subsection details about the arts and sciences.
The fourth lays out the guidelines for the characteristics required in the friends of the king.
The fifth subsection describes the functions and duties of the king.
The sixth on maintenance and security of forts.
The seventh subsection lays out the functions and composition of the army.
The concluding chapter seven deals with miscellaneous and supplementary rules on morality as laid down in Shastras to promote the overall welfare of the people and the state.

Relevance
Though the book has centuries of history attached to it, the contents of it are still relevant in current-day politics, especially in the Indian context. Shukracharya lays out the virtues and qualities required in the king and crown prince, which would make a liberal and democratic leader. Most of the verses of chapter I and II are considered relevant in current day administrations of any democratic state in the world. For example, in chapter 2 the codebook says, the king should not take any policy decisions unilaterally without consulting his council of ministers and a ruler who arbitrarily makes the decision, shall be alienated from his kingdom and the people. Similarly, the Shukranīti places people as the ultimate source of the power. In chapter-I it states; the ruler is placed as the servant to the people. One of the most discussed topics relevant to current times is the stress given on Karma in Shukranīti. Shukracharya states that one becomes Brahmana, Kshatriya, Vaishya or Shudra based on fundamental concepts like ones character (Guna) and deeds (Karma).. The book further advises the king to appoint his subordinates in any post irrespective of his jati.

References

Bibliography

 
 
 
 

History of India
Sanskrit literature
Sanskrit encyclopedias
Vedic period
Ancient Indian law
Legal history of India